Veda (NZ) Limited is the largest credit reference agency in New Zealand. Previously, it was called Baycorp, Baycorp Advantage, and until recently Veda Advantage, and is now simply called Veda.

Business
Veda is effectively the only credit reference agency of any size in NZ, and thus has a near monopoly in this field. It supplies credit information on both individuals and companies. Its business is largely governed by the Credit Reporting Privacy Code (New Zealand), issued under the Privacy Act.

History
The origins of Veda was a group of credit providers sharing credit information with its members, which was called the Credit Reference Association. This database was later taken over by Baycorp.

For many years Veda owned the largest debt collection company in New Zealand, Baycorp Collection Services, which it sold off in 2007 for $97 million.

In 2002, Baycorp in New Zealand merged with Data Advantage in Australia, with the merged company being called Baycorp Advantage.

Criticisms
Veda is often criticised of having a poor complaints process and that it has a poor attitude to listing and correcting incorrect information on its credit records.

Veda often is included in the Privacy Commission’s annual top 10 list of the number of NZ organisations it has received complaints against.

Financials
Veda changed from a public company to a private company in 2007, and now does not publish its annual reports. However, for the financial year ending 30 June 2007, out of a total revenue of $32,654,000, Veda made a profit of $12,336,000, and after paying a special dividend that year of $30,000,000, Veda had shareholder funds of $76,921,000.

References

External links
 Veda website
 Veda 30 June 2007 Financial Statements
Credit scoring
Financial services companies of New Zealand